St. Mary's International School is a private international school for boys located in the Setagaya ward of Tokyo, Japan. The school consists of an elementary, middle, and high school, all located in the Setagaya campus. The school’s primary language of instruction is English, and it also offers the International Baccalaureate program.

History
The school was founded in 1954 by the Brothers of Christian Instruction and resides in the St. Francis Xavier district of the FIC. The school serves International students living in or near Tokyo, as well as many Japanese students seeking a Western, English-medium education. St. Mary's offers religious instruction, and Catholic students may attend mass. Although St. Mary's is a Catholic school, students do not have to be Catholic to attend.

Allegations of sexual abuse have been made against the school.  One of the claimed victims is making a documentary about his experiences.

Accreditation
St. Mary's is accredited by the Council of International Schools and the Western Association of Schools and Colleges. It is a member of the East Asia Regional Council of Overseas Schools and the Japan Council of International Schools. St. Mary's is always recognized by the Kanto Plains Schools Association as a unanimous vote for the best school in Tokyo, and the Kanto Region.

Campus
The  campus features a large, lighted indoor swimming pool with a balcony for visiting audiences, an indoor multi-athletic court with a contractable stage + seats, a large multi purpose hall which converts into an auditorium, number of tennis courts, two outdoor basketball courts, a large soccer field with appropriate synthetic grass, a mass of gardened land, and numbers of other athletic facilities. The three-story classroom buildings hold classes for grades 1 through 12, plus a readiness program and programs for students using English as a second language (ESL). Additionally, the school features two large libraries for study, one of them featuring an outdoor 'rooftop' garden, and has computer access throughout all if its classrooms. A chapel and on-site residency for the brothers are also available.

The school is served by the Futako-Tamagawa Station (Tōkyū Den-en-toshi Line) and Kami-noge Station (Tōkyū Ōimachi Line) train stations. A fleet of 11 buses owned by the school moves students throughout Tokyo. Seisen International School, a Catholic girls' school, also allows their students to ride on St. Mary's school bus system.

Athletics

St. Mary's encourages its students to join sports teams. The teams' name is the Titans, except the swim team (which also includes students from Seisen International School), which is known as the Buccaneers. The St. Mary's teams compete against other KPASSP schools and have won KPASSP titles, and compete against other international schools.

High School Extra-Curricular Athletic Programs

Fall

      Cross Country
      Tennis
      Intramurals: Table Tennis, Badminton, Handball, 3-on-3 Basketball,  Indoor Soccer, Volleyball 
      Swimming

Winter

      Soccer
      Basketball
      Wrestling
      Swimming

Spring

      Track and Field
      Baseball
      Swimming

Recent Athletic Highlights
2018 Far East Individual and Duals Co-Champions, Wrestling
2017 Far East Individual and Duals Champions, Wrestling
2016 Far East Individual and Duals Champions, Wrestling
2016 Kanto Individual Champions, Wrestling
2016 Kanto League Champions, Wrestling
2016 Kanto League Champions, Basketball
2016 Far East Individual Champions, Cross Country
2015 Far East Individual Champions, Wrestling
2014 Far East Individual Champions, Wrestling
2013 Kanto Tournament Champions, Soccer
2012 Kanto League Champions, Soccer
2012 Far East Champions, Wrestling
2011 Kanto League Champions, Soccer
2011 Far East Champions, Wrestling
2011 Kanto League Champions, Wrestling
2011 Guam Invitational Champions, Cross Country
2011 Kanto League Champions, Cross Country
2011 Far East Champions, Tennis
2011 Kanto League, Kanto Tournament Champion, Tennis
2010 Kanto League, Kanto Tournament Champions, Baseball

 2010 Kanto League, Kanto Tournament, Hawaii Moanalua Thanksgiving Tournament Champions, Varsity Soccer
2009 Kanto League, Kanto Tournament, Okinawa Spring Fling Tournament Champions, Baseball
2009 Far East Boys Class AA Champion, Varsity Basketball 
2009 Kanto co-league champion,  JV Basketball 
2009 Kanto tournament champion, Varsity Soccer 
2009 Kanto league and tournament champion, JV Soccer 
2009 Kanto co-league champions; CAJ/SMIS tournament champ,  Wrestling

Opponents 
St. Mary's' main rival is Christian Academy in Japan. Many athletic games have been played by the two schools, and both teams strive to beat each other. Other regional rivals include American School in Japan, Nile C. Kinnick High School, Yokota High School, and The British School in Tokyo Yokohama international school

Fine Arts
St. Mary's Fine Arts include:
Vocal Music
Instrumental Music
2-D Art
3-D Art
Photography
Architecture
BrainBowl Team
Robotics Team
Debate Team
Speech Team
Math Contest Team
Fall Play
Musical

Students can earn International Baccalaureate credit in some courses.

The vocal music program features groups such as the Men's Choir, Varsity Ensemble and International Show Choir. These award-winning choirs have performed in the United States, Austria, Hungary, Canada, Australia, China, South Korea, Indonesia, and many other countries. St. Mary's high schoolers may also take part in the Tokyo Area Honor Choir amongst other KPASSP schools, if they are accepted through auditioning. The St. Mary's High Schoolers enroll in contests in the United States with other choirs from universities, since the level on tone and quality of the choir is very high. St. Mary's has never lost a choir competition in the Kanto Plains.

The instrumental music program features groups such as the Concert Band, Jazz Band, and the Wind Ensemble. Seisen International School collaborates with St. Mary's for the Orchestra used in the Musical. Similarly to the choir, high schoolers may take part in the Tokyo Area Honor Band amongst other KPASSP schools, if they are accepted through auditioning.

2-D Art, 3-D Art, and Architecture courses are also provided at the school, with students taking the International Baccalaureate being able to take these classes as credited courses. Notable artwork usually gets into the Tokyo Artscape, an annual exhibit collaborated on by some KPASSP schools, and some other Tokyo Area schools.

The BrainBowl Team competes in the annual BrainBowl tournament, where SMIS has proven to be a powerhouse, capturing the title 32 times out of the 41 championships. The last title it won was in 2018, the most recent tournament, with a 150-point lead ahead of its next school.

The Debate Team at St. Mary's is also particularly strong, and competes against Seisen International School, The American School in Japan, the International School of the Sacred Heart, and Yokota High School. The team has won the annual Kanto Plains Debate Tournament three years in a row, from 2010 to 2012. It also won in 2021, with all three All-Stars being from St. Mary's. 

The Speech Team at SMIS is also a strong team, and they compete in the annual Speech Contest amongst other KPASSP schools. In the most recent tournament, held at Seisen in Fall 2012, the SMIS Speech Team won second place.

Each year, the Math Contest team, composed of students skilled at math, take part in the Math Field Day, a tournament for KPASSP students. St. Mary's tends to do particularly well there too, with usually at least 1 member of the team in the Top 5 at every grade level.

The fall showcases the Fall Play, where selected students perform and help to make it an annual success, while every year in the spring, selected students perform and help in the Musical.

The fall also showcases the Varsity Robotics Team which competes internationally and nationally in competitive Robotics.

Activities
Activities at St. Mary's include a student newspaper, The Diplomat; a Boy Scouts of America troop, Troop 15; the Yearbook; a television club; the Fall Play; a Musical; and others.

St. Mary's Campus Reconstruction
St. Mary's has completed all phases of a complete campus reconstruction, the St. Mary's Campus Reconstruction project. The main academic and administrative center has opened on the site of the former sports field, in March 2009. Construction of the new pool/cafeteria and gym/art/music buildings was completed in August 2010. The Multi-Purpose Room and Parking Lot were completed in March 2011.

Notable alumni
Chris Peppler
Don Nomura
John Ken Nuzzo
Derrek Lee
Verbal
Taku Takahashi
Charles Tsunashima
Keitaro Harada
Daisuke Murakami
Nam Do-hyon, member of X1

References

External links
St. Mary's International School official website
Profile at the Good Schools Guide International
SMIS photos on Darksea Studios
SMIS photos on Sudo Productions

Christianity in Tokyo
International schools in Tokyo
Private schools in Tokyo
International Baccalaureate schools in Japan
Boys' schools in Japan
Catholic schools in Japan
Educational institutions established in 1954
Elementary schools in Japan
1954 establishments in Japan
Setagaya